Foods of the World was a series of 27 cookbooks published by Time-Life, beginning in 1968 and extending through the late 1970s, that provided a broad survey of many of the world's major cuisines. The individual volumes were written by well-known experts on the various cuisines and included significant contemporary food writers, including Craig Claiborne, Pierre Franey, James Beard, Julia Child, and M.F.K. Fisher, and was overseen by food writer Michael Field who died before the series was complete. The series combined recipes with food-themed travelogues in an attempt to show the cultural context from which each recipe sprang.

Each volume came in two parts—the main book was a large-format, photograph-heavy hardcover book, while extra recipes were presented in a spiralbound booklet with cover artwork to complement the main book. The individual volumes remain collector's items and are widely available on the secondhand market.

The 27 volumes (in alphabetical, not chronological order) include:
 African Cooking
 American Cooking
 American Cooking : Creole and Acadian
 American Cooking : The Eastern Heartland 
 American Cooking : The Great West
 American Cooking : The Melting Pot
 American Cooking : New England
 American Cooking : The Northwest 
 American Cooking : Southern Style 
 Classic French Cooking
 Cooking of the British Isles
 Cooking of the Caribbean Islands
 Cooking of China
 Cooking of Germany 
 Cooking of India
 Cooking of Italy
 Cooking of Japan
 Cooking of Provincial France
 Cooking of Scandinavia
 Cooking of Spain and Portugal
 Cooking of Vienna's Empire
 Latin American Cooking 
 Middle Eastern Cooking 
 Pacific and Southeast Asian Cooking 
 Quintet of Cuisines
 Russian Cooking
 Wines and Spirits

The Supplements included:
 Menu Guide & Recipe Index (1971) 
 Supplement Number One (1968) – Rice, French bread, shopper's guide (sources), et al. 
 Supplement Number Two (1969) – Deep frying
 Kitchen Guide (1968) - Equipment, protein items, glossary of terms, carving, meal planning

See also

The Good Cook

References

Foods
Series of books